The black turtle bean is a small, shiny variety of the common bean (Phaseolus vulgaris) especially popular in Latin American cuisine, though it can also be found in the Cajun and Creole cuisines of south Louisiana. Like all varieties of the common bean, it is native to the Americas, but has been introduced around the world. It is also used in Indian cuisine, Tamil cuisine, where it is known as karuppu kaaramani and in Maharashtrian cuisine, where it is known as Kala Ghevada.  It is widely used in Uttrakhand India also known as “Bhatt “ . It is a rich source of iron and protein. The black turtle bean is often simply called the black bean (frijoles negros, zaragoza, judía negra, poroto negro, caraota negra, or habichuela negra in Spanish; and feijão preto in Portuguese), although this terminology can cause confusion with at least three other types of black beans.

The black turtle bean is the only type of turtle bean. It is called turtle because of its hard outer "shell".

Background

The black bean has a dense, meaty texture, which makes it popular in vegetarian dishes, such as frijoles negros and the Mexican-American black bean burrito. It is a very popular bean in various regions of Brazil, and is used in the national dish, feijoada. It is also a main ingredient of Moros y Cristianos in Cuba, is a required ingredient in the typical gallo pinto of Costa Rica and Nicaragua, is a fundamental part of Pabellón criollo in Venezuela, and is served in almost all of Latin America, as well as many Hispanic enclaves in the United States. In the Dominican Republic cuisine, it is also used for a variation of the Moros y Cristianos simply called Moro de habichuelas negras. The black turtle bean is also popular as a soup ingredient. In Cuba, black bean soup is a traditional dish, usually served with white rice. Black beans sticky rice is a Thai dessert.

The bean was first widely grown in the present-day United States after the Mexican–American War (1846–1848). However, initially the variety was primarily grown as a snap pea (for the edible seed pod).

It is also common to keep the boiled water of these beans (which acquires a black coloring) and consume it as a soup with other ingredients for seasoning (known as sopa negra, black soup, or as sopa de frijoles, bean soup), as a broth (caldo de frijol, bean broth) or to season or color other dishes (aforementioned gallo pinto, for example).

Samples of black turtle beans were reported in 2006 to contain total anthocyanins in their dried seed coats of 0−2.78 mg/g.

Gallery

See also 

 Pinto bean
 Kidney bean

References

External links

 The World's Healthiest Foods - Black Beans
Phaseolus
Edible legumes
Vegan cuisine
Vegetarian cuisine
Crops